Saldón is a municipality located in the province of Teruel, Aragon, Spain. According to the 2010 census (INE), the municipality had a population of 29 inhabitants.

References

Municipalities in the Province of Teruel